Aerides odorata is a species of plant in the Orchidaceae. It is widespread across much of Southeast Asia, found in the lowland forests of China (Yunnan, Guangdong), Himalayas, Bhutan, Assam, Bangladesh, India, Nepal, Andaman and Nicobar Islands, Myanmar, Thailand, Laos, Cambodia, Vietnam, Peninsular Malaysia, Borneo, Sumatra, Java, Sulawesi, the Lesser Sunda Islands, and the Philippines.  Its natural habitat is subtropical or tropical moist lowland forest. It is threatened by habitat loss.

References

External links 

Orchids of the Philippines
Orchids of India
Orchids of China
Orchids of Assam
Orchids of Bangladesh
Orchids of Nepal
Orchids of Myanmar
Orchids of Thailand
Orchids of Laos
Orchids of Cambodia
Orchids of Vietnam
Orchids of Malaysia
Orchids of Indonesia
Orchids of Borneo
Orchids of Sumatra
Orchids of Java
Flora of the Andaman Islands
Flora of the Nicobar Islands
Flora of Sulawesi
Flora of Bhutan
odorata
Endangered plants
Plants described in 1790